Ovčara may refer to:

 Ovčara, Vukovar-Syrmia County, a hamlet near Vukovar, Croatia, the location of the 1991 Vukovar massacre
 Ovčara, Osijek-Baranja County, a former village now part of Čepin, Croatia
 Ovčara Suhopoljska, a former village now part of Suhopolje, Croatia